Thorunna punicea is a species of sea slug, a dorid nudibranch, a shell-less marine gastropod mollusk in the family Chromodorididae.

Distribution 
This species was described from Passe de Koumac, New Caledonia, .

Description
This species is similar in coloration to Hypselodoris melanesica and Mexichromis albofimbria. It has a purple mantle with a thin white margin and darker purple bases to the rhinophores and gills.

Ecology

References

Chromodorididae
Gastropods described in 1995